Justin Dart may refer to:

Justin Whitlock Dart Sr. (1907–1984), American businessman
Justin Whitlock Dart Jr. (1930–2002), his son, American activist